Church of Santo Domingo may refer to:

Church of Santo Domingo de Guzmán (Málaga)
Church of Santo Domingo de Silos (Millana)
Church of Santo Domingo (Puebla)
Church of Santo Domingo de Guzmán (Oaxaca)
Church of Santo Domingo (Soria)